Insulin induced gene 2, also known as INSIG2, is a protein which in humans is encoded by the INSIG2  gene.

Regulation 

Insulin activates the human INSIG2 promoter in a process mediated by phosphorylated SAP1a.

Akt mediates suppression of Insig2a, a liver-specific transcript encoding the SREBP1c inhibitor INSIG2.

MCHR2 has been observed to significantly decrease INSIG2.

Insig2 is upregulated under hypoxic conditions and is associated with the malignant potential of pancreatic cancer.

A novel 1alpha,25-dihydroxyvitamin D3 [1,25-(OH)2D3] response element in the promoter region of Insig-2 gene was identified which specifically binds to the heterodimer of retinoid X receptor and vitamin D receptor (VDR) and directs VDR-mediated transcriptional activation in a 1,25-(OH)2D3-dependent manner. 1,25-(OH)2D3 transiently but strongly induces Insig-2 expression in 3T3-L1 cells. This novel regulatory circuit may also play important roles in other lipogenic cell types that express VDR.

Function 

The protein encoded by this gene is highly similar to the protein product encoded by gene INSIG1. Both INSIG1 protein and this protein are endoplasmic reticulum proteins that block the processing of sterol regulatory element binding proteins (SREBPs) by binding to SREBP cleavage-activating protein (SCAP), and thus prevent SCAP from escorting SREBPs to the Golgi.

Clinical Significance 

Insig deficiency in mice caused a marked buildup of cholesterol precursors in skin associated with a marked increase in 3-hydroxy-3-methylglutaryl coenzyme A reductase protein and hair and skin defects corrected by topical simvastatin, an inhibitor of reductase.

REV-ERBalpha participates in the circadian modulation of sterol regulatory element-binding protein (SREBP) activity, and thereby in the daily expression of SREBP target genes involved in cholesterol and lipid metabolism. This control is exerted via the cyclic transcription of Insig2, encoding a trans-membrane protein that sequesters SREBP proteins to the endoplasmic reticulum membranes and thereby interferes with the proteolytic activation of SREBPs in Golgi membranes. REV-ERBalpha also participates in the cyclic expression of cholesterol-7alpha-hydroxylase (CYP7A1), the rate-limiting enzyme in converting cholesterol to bile acids. Findings suggest that this control acts via the stimulation of LXR nuclear receptors by cyclically produced oxysterols such that rhythmic cholesterol and bile acid metabolism is not just driven by alternating feeding-fasting cycles, but also by REV-ERBalpha, a component of the circadian clockwork circuitry.

Silibinin inhibits adipocyte differentiation through a potential up-regulation of insig-1 and insig-2 at an early phase in adipocyte differentiation.

The triacylglycerol reducing effect of fibrates and thiazolidinediones, strong and selective agonists of PPARalpha and PPARgamma, is partially caused by inhibition of SREBP-1 activation via up-regulation of Insig.

Findings suggest that Insig2 is a novel colon cancer biomarker. Over-expression of Insig2 appeared to suppress chemotherapeutic drug treatment-induced Bcl2 associated X protein (Bax) expression and activation. Insig2 was also found to localize to the mitochondria/heavy membrane fraction and associate with conformationally changed Bax. Moreover, Insig2 altered the expression of several additional apoptosis genes located in mitochondria. In a study by Kumar et al., the common polymorphisms in INSIG2 gene was not found to be significant in Indian population.

References

Further reading